Zaydan is a surname. Notable people with the surname include:

Banu Zaydan, Arab clan that dominated the Galilee late 17th-early 18th centuries
Amina Zaydan (born 1966), Egyptian novelist
Hasan Zaydan, Iraqi politician
Ibn Zaydan (1878–1946), Moroccan historian and literary author
Jurji Zaydan (1861–1914), Lebanese novelist

Arabic-language surnames